Phosphatidylcholine transfer protein (PCTP) also known as StAR-related lipid transfer domain protein 2 (STARD2) is a specific intracellular phospholipid binding protein that can transfer phosphatidylcholine between different membranes in the cytosol.

In humans, phosphatidylcholine transfer protein is encoded by the PCTP gene.

Function
PCTP transfers phosphatidylcholine molecules between membranes in vitro.  Further studies found that sensitivity to phosphatidylcholine levels causes PCTP to interact with select enzymes, promoting their activation.  PCTP stimulates the acyl-CoA thioesterase activity of thioesterase superfamily member 2 (Them2)/acyl-CoA thioesterase 13 (ACOT13) and the activity of homeodomain transcription factor paired box gene 3 (PAX3).  Protein kinase C phosphorylation promotes localization of PCTP to the mitochondrion where it may activate Them2.

Structure
This soluble protein is 214 amino acids long.  It is almost entirely composed of a StAR-related transfer domain (START).  X-ray crystallography shows that this domain forms a pocket that can bind a single molecule of phosphatidylcholine.

This protein also founds the StarD2 subfamily of proteins.  This subfamily consists of PCTP, StarD7, StarD10 and collagen type IV alpha-3-binding protein or StarD11, all of which bind phosphatidylcholine except for StarD11 which prefers ceramide.

Tissue distribution and pathology
PCTP is produced in all tissues in the body at various levels.  The protein is expressed at high levels in tissues engaged in high metabolism, notably including the liver and macrophages.

No human patients with defects in PCTP have been described to date.  Mice lacking PCTP exhibit a resistance to atherosclerosis linked to changes in plasma lipid levels and changes in body weight linked to the level of brown fat use of fatty acids and Them2 activity.  Loss of PCTP in fasting mice alters the sensitivity of the liver to insulin, reducing glucose and free fatty acid levels.

References

External links 
 

Genes on human chromosome 17
Water-soluble transporters